There are over 20,000 Grade II* listed buildings in England. This page is a list of these buildings in the district of Eastleigh in Hampshire.

Eastleigh

|}

Notes

External links

Southampton
Grade II* listed buildings in Hampshire by place
Borough of Eastleigh